Culbert is a personal name that seems to have originated in Europe.  The earliest records for this surname are found in England, Scotland, and Ireland.  The use of surnames became necessary when governments introduced personal taxation.  In England, heritable surnames started to form in the 11th century, and were common in most areas by 1400. The poll tax introduced in England in the 14th century (considered a head tax) is probably the first time this common usage of surnames was documented.

Culbert origins 

A specific origin for this name is not known; however, it does not appear to be derived from a place, nor from an occupation, two common sources for peoples' names.

The following references suggest that Culbert may be derived from other names that describe a person's character.  For example, Culbert may stem from Culbheart, which is a Gaelic form meaning "crafty". However, Culbert is not a Gaelic name.  It is possible the earliest Culberts in Ireland came there from Scotland and England as a result of the creation of the Plantations of Ulster in the early 1600s.  The earliest Culbert record found to date in Ireland is for James Culbert, born in 1651.

Also, crafty is related to "wisdom," and this suggests a possible connection with the surname Cuthbert, a name from the Anglo Saxon, which means "famous, bright, of clear skill or knowledge". It is also believed by some researchers that Culbert is derived from Cutbert. This earlier spelling is very similar to Cuthbert and Cuthbertson, one reason for the close relationship between these surnames.  The surname is also closely related to Culbertson and Culberson, which mean son of Culbert.

With regards to claims of origin, MacLysaght states that the surname Culbert is of Huguenot origin, and is found mainly in Ireland's northern province of Ulster.  However, no record has yet been found to document that any Culbert was a Huguenot or a Huguenot descendant.

In Scotland, Culbert is considered a variant of Colbert, derived from the Anglo-Saxon Ceolberht/Ceolbeorht (in Old English, ceol = ship and berht/beorht = bright). They suggest Culbert is a personal name dating from the 700s in England; however, no actual records have been found in England for another 850 years.

Also for England, one heraldry-related website claims that Culbert is one of the names of people who migrated there from Normandy following the Norman Conquest, and that Culbert has been found in the Counties of Cheshire and Lancashire.  Unfortunately, these records also have not been uncovered.  The earliest Culbert found in FamilySearch records for Cheshire is William Culbert b. bef. 1706, and for Lancashire is Thomas Culbert b. bef. 1764. The oldest Culbert record found to date anywhere is for Mutton Culbert, who married Alice Legge on 27 Mar 1554 at St. Nicholas, Ipswich, Suffolk, England.

The earliest home of a Culbertson (son of Culbert) so far found is located in the County of Roxburg, Scotland, at a small village named Morebattle, eight miles south of Kelso.  Here Culbertson people have reportedly lived continuously since the year 1400 AD.  This is in the Lowlands and is about five miles from the Cheviot Hills, which form the boundary between Scotland and England.

Culbert distribution 

As migrations from Europe became more common in the 19th and 20th Centuries, Culbert people have spread from Europe and have now become more predominant in the United States, Canada, Australia and New Zealand. For example, in the 1881 Census of the United Kingdom (including England, Scotland, Wales, and Ireland), 91 Culbert individuals were indexed, compared to 256 individuals in the 1881 Canada Census, and compared to 620 individuals in the 1880 U.S. Federal Census.

In 2000, the surname Culbert was ranked 12,650 in terms of the most common surnames in the United States, with 2,244 occurrences in the 2000 U.S. Federal Census. The racial/ethnic breakdown included nearly 77 percent White, almost 20 percent Black, a little more than 2 percent Hispanic, about 1 percent Non-Hispanic of two or more races, and minor amounts (less than 1 percent) of Asian and Pacific Islander or American Indian and Alaskan Native.

An extract of an Office of National Statistics database containing a list of surnames in use in England, Wales and the Isle of Mann in September 2002 suggests that Culbert was ranked 13,686, with 389 occurrences.

People 

Culbert is used as both a given name and as a surname, as in the following examples of persons:
 Culbert Olson was an American politician and governor of California.
 David Culbert, from Australia, is a former international track and field athlete who specialized in the long jump.
 Harold William Culbert (1944–2005) was a member of the House of Commons of Canada from 1993 to 1997.
 Katharine Culbert Lyall was the former president (retired, 2004) of the University of Wisconsin System.
 Major Culbert (born 1987), American football player.
 Sidney S. Culbert (1913–2003) was an American psychologist and Esperantist.

Places and things named Culbert 

The following places and objects carrying the name Culbert have been identified to date.  Their geographic diversity indicates the geographic diversity of Culbert people.

Australia
 Culbert Learning Center, Calvary Christian College, Queensland.  [Note: This college is located on three campuses, and it is uncertain which one holds this Center, announced in 2022.]
 Culbert Street, Spring Farm, Sydney, NSW 2570 [Note: this road was on a Feb 2021 house sale listing, but cannot be found on Google Maps.]

The Bahamas
 Culbert's Hill, Nassau GPS: 25.04296590999284, -77.2727677307507
 Culbert's Bay, Nassau GPS: 25.029230463410634, -77.26378769497185

Canada
 Culbert Lake, Northern Manitoba, near the border with Nunavut.  Location not yet found.  Named for Frederick Campbell Culbert, Royal Canadian Air Force, who was in a bomber shot down over Germany in 1943.
 Culbert Drive, Woodstock, New Brunswick E7M1N9 GPS: 46.169384440400016, -67.58216000153968
 Wendy Culbert Cres, Newmarket, Ontario L3X0E9 GPS: 44.029745793712756, -79.45483234391597
 Culbert Creek and Culbert Lake, Algoma (North), Ontario GPS: beginning in south at 48.95583073017929, -83.98440542745253, and flowing north through Culbert Lake at 48.96574908949619, -83.98633661792923, and continuing north to creek junction at 49.057301995716195, -83.97676649616454 

U.K.
 Culbert Avenue, Didsbury, Manchester, England, U.K. M20 6HB [image available] GPS: 53.420271692859906, -2.2205261878677227
 Culbert Lodge, near Eland Street, New Basford, Nottinghamshire, England, U.K.
 Culbert's Court, located in the middle of Little York Street, Belfast [Ireland, now Northern Ireland, U.K.; had 15 small houses in 1860.]
 Culbert Street, Portsoy, Aberdeenshire, Scotland, U.K. GPS: 57.68347814374989, -2.690704060138086 [ref. Councillor Jack Mair, 6 Oct 2008: The people in Portsoy used to call Culbert Street - The Culbert Rig, which is a refurbished traditional fisherman's cottage.  Our late local historian, Jim Slater, had a theory that a gentleman named Culbert had a croft at this location. I do not know what evidence he had to arrive at this conclusion. The street slopes down from The Square and at the bottom of the street there is a culvert which carries the water from the Loch, formerly the mill dam, to the sea.  I have heard culvert mispronounced culbert.  There is also a possibility that Culbert may be a misspelling of Gilbert.  When the registration of Births, Deaths and Marriages came into effect a number of people were illiterate and it depended on the Registrar how names were spelled. Gilbert may have been mispronounced to sound like Culbert.]

U.S.
 Culbert Hollow Spring, Cherokee, Alabama 35616 GPS: 34.82035530092676, -88.07649664490704
 There is, or at least was, a Culbert County, Alabama, containing Sheffield and Muscle Shoals.  There still is a Colbert County, Alabama.
 Culbert Street, Livingston, Sumter County, Alabama  GPS: 32.46172066418088, -88.12850989628917
 Culbert Street, Phoenix, Arizona
 Culbert Street, Little Rock, Arkansas
 Culbert P.O., Randolph County, Georgia.  [In 1860 Census; Culbert and/or Cuthbert Post Office; 1870 Randolph County, Georgia, there at least to early 1900s.]
 Culbert Street, Bainbridge, Decatur County, Georgia
 Culbert Mine, Upson County, Georgia, U.S.A., c. 1943 [re. photo on EBay]
 Double Culbert Cemetery, Fayette County, Kentucky [ref. Fayette County Genealogical Society Quarterly, Vol. 5, Issue 3, Fall 1990]
 Culbert Zeigler Cemetery, 25197 Zeigler Cemetery Road, Livingston, Louisiana  GPS: 30.433060448818836, -90.70209099359329
 Culbert Street, Mattapan (Boston), Massachusetts GPS: 42.27383535283655, -71.0944025727904 [An inquiry sent to Public Works, Boston on 28 Sep 2004 had no response.] 
 Culbert Place, Roxbury Crossing (Boston), Massachusetts.  Found in Boston City Directories from 1872 to 1915, when it was changed to Vitale Place.
 Culbert Drive, Hastings, Michigan 49058  GPS: 42.6983551991604, -85.26472217278128
 Culbert Road, between Hillsdale and Hudson, Hillsdale County, Michigan. GPS: 41.898658323538264, -84.45091400163452  [Probably associated with the David Culbert family who settled in Hillsdale County.]

 Culbert Road, Moss Point, Jackson County, Mississippi  GPS: 30.580779716363004, -88.56492340183996
 Culbert Lake, (part of the Pascagoula River), south of Wade, Jackson County, Mississippi  GPS: 30.58613731442976, -88.57129855899265
 Culbert Street, New York City, New York
 Culbert's Hotel on Buffalo Avenue in the LaSalle neighborhood of Niagara Falls, New York  GPS: 43.07775547859788, -78.96243484393693  [Now permanently closed]
 Culbert Street in Syracuse, New York  GPS; 43.07225896231679, -76.14990844393702
 Culbert Street, Mount Airy, Surry County, North Carolina  GPS: 36.49063257061876, -80.60356304406895
 Culbert school-house; located 2 miles east of Centerville, PA.  [Mentioned in connection with sermons preached there by Rev. Peter Sahm, after 1836, as part of the history of St. John's Evangelical Lutheran Church, New Florence, PA.; ]
 Culbert Street in Philadelphia, Pennsylvania, U.S.A.  [Notes: Moak's "Philadelphia Street Name Changes" had no listing for "Culbert"; 1839 - Culbert Street joined Charlotte Street; 1859 Phila. Directory on the web contains 7 listings for a street named "Culbert".  Here is what I found for "Culbert": street addresses from "below third" to "2052"; intersections with "Canal", "Charlotte", and "Mechanic"]
 Culbert Street, Pittsburgh, Pennsylvania, U.S.A.
 Culbert Branch Missionary Baptist Church, 647 Elko Street, Williston, South Carolina. (803) 266-4252  GPS: 33.402026737434454, -81.41267414597611
 Culbert Beverage Company, Aberdeen, South Dakota; bottled ROBO drinks
 South Culbert Avenue, Sioux Falls, Minnehaha County, South Dakota GPS: 43.4968754642374, -96.82331991509153  [Named for the Richard Lyle Culbert family who had a farm here]
 South Culbert Avenue, Sioux Falls, Lincoln County, South Dakota GPS: 43.497899437494, -96.82338428650814 
 Culbert Drive, Marion, Virginia  GPS: 36.85046934087106, -81.5047607440623

 Ken Culbert, Jr. Road, Purcellville, Loudoun County, Virginia GPS: 39.13751434247276, -77.70248115936316  [Named for Kenneth William Culbert, 1939-2003]

Other Culbert names
 A bark, the M. H. Culbert, which operated at least from 1866 to 1867
 Ship Culbert – "Orkney Shipping, Sailed from Stromness, Sept. 13, Culbert, from Gottenburgh, with iron and deals"
 Ship Culbert – "Ship News, Sailed, 18th, Culbert, oats"
 Ship St. Culbert – "Ship Arrivals. From Calcutta. [Ship] St. Culbert, Toombs, of Portsmouth, from New York, just arrived."
 Schooner Culbert – "Ship News, Port of Philadelphia, Arrived, Schooner Culbert, [from] Virginia"

References

External links 
 The Culbert Family Genealogy Project, a One Name Study registered with the Guild of One-Name Studies.